Asier Etxaburu Diz (born 7 April 1994) is a Spanish footballer who plays for SD Amorebieta as a winger.

Club career
Born in Ondarroa, Biscay, Basque Country, Etxaburu joined Athletic Bilbao's youth setup in 2004. Released in 2007, he subsequently represented CD Aurrerá Ondarroa and SD Eibar before returning to Athletic in 2010 along with his twin brother Jon, a striker. Part of the Juvenil A team which played in the 2012-13 NextGen Series and were runners-up in the 2013 Copa del Rey Juvenil, he made his debut as a senior with the farm team CD Basconia in Tercera División, in 2013.

After two seasons at Basconia, on 8 June 2015 Etxaburu was released by the Lions  and subsequently joined Eibar's reserve team CD Vitoria, but spent the whole pre-season with the main squad. He made his first team debut on 16 December, starting in a 4–0 Copa del Rey home routing of SD Ponferradina.

On 10 July 2018, Etxaburu signed for Real Unión in Segunda División B. On 20 July 2020, he moved to fellow league team SD Amorebieta, and was a regular starter as the club achieved a first-ever promotion to Segunda División.

References

External links

1994 births
Living people
Spanish twins
Twin sportspeople
People from Ondarroa
Spanish footballers
Sportspeople from Biscay
Footballers from the Basque Country (autonomous community)
Association football wingers
Segunda División B players
Tercera División players
Athletic Bilbao footballers
CD Basconia footballers
CD Vitoria footballers
SD Eibar footballers
Real Unión footballers
SD Amorebieta footballers